Corn Hill is a hill in Barnstable County, Massachusetts. Smalls Hill is located east of Corn Hill. The Pilgrims are believed to have discovered (and taken much of) a cache of Payomet Indian seed corn from the top of Corn Hill in November 1620, before they moved on from their landing at today’s Provincetown to the current location of Plymouth.

References

Mountains of Massachusetts
Mountains of Barnstable County, Massachusetts